Archita may refer to:

 Archita Sahu, Indian actress
 Archita Ricci, Italian painter
 Archita, Mureș, a village in Vânători Commune, Mureș County, Romania
 Archita (river), a river in Mureș County, Romania